The Festival Latinoamericano de Video Rosario ("Rosario Latin American Video Festival") is a cultural event celebrated annually, since 1994, in Rosario, province of Santa Fe, Argentina.

The festival is organized jointly by the municipal government (in particular the Audiovisual Center of the Municipal Secretary of Culture and Education), and by TEA Imagen (Integral Television Production School) of Buenos Aires. It is intended for video filmmakers, students and teachers, and for the general public, and includes presentation of films, competitions, conferences, lectures and discussion forums.

In 2005 the festival was celebrated from 9 September to 18 September, in three locations: the La Comedia Theater, the Museum of Contemporary Art of Rosario (MACRo), and the Auditorium of the Municipal Bank of Rosario.

Winners 2015

Sources
 Ente Turístico Rosario: XII Festival Latinoamericano de Video Rosario 2005 (in Spanish)
 Municipality of Rosario - Official website (in Spanish)

References 
Culture in Rosario, Santa Fe
Film festivals in Argentina
Latin American film festivals